Benedetto Landi (1578–1638) was a Catholic prelate who served as Bishop of Fossombrone (1628–1632).

Biography
Benedetto Landi was born in  Velletri, Italy in 1578.
On 5 June 1628, he was appointed during the papacy of Pope Urban VIII as Bishop of Fossombrone.
On 13 June 1628, he was consecrated bishop by Antonio Marcello Barberini, Bishop of Senigallia, with Lorenzo Azzolini, Bishop of Ripatransone, and Tiberio Cenci, Bishop of Jesi, serving as co-consecrators. 
He served as Bishop of Fossombrone until his resignation on 15 November 1632. 
He died in 1638.

Episcopal succession
While bishop, he was the principal co-consecrator of:

References

External links and additional sources
 (for Chronology of Bishops) 
 (for Chronology of Bishops) 

17th-century Italian Roman Catholic bishops
Bishops appointed by Pope Urban VIII
1578 births
1638 deaths
People from Velletri